Three is the third studio album by the American indie rock band The Black Heart Procession.  It was released on September 5, 2000, on Touch and Go Records.

Track listing
 "We Always Knew" - 5:26
 "Guess I'll Forget You" - 4:39
 "Once Said at the Fires" - 4:13
 "Waterfront (The Sinking Road)" - 5:45
 "Till We Have to Say Goodbye" - 2:49
 "I Know Your Ways" - 4:11
 "Never from This Heart" - 4:46
 "A Heart Like Mine" - 3:25
 "The War Is Over" - 3:51
 "On Ships of Gold" - 7:17

References

2000 albums
The Black Heart Procession albums
Touch and Go Records albums